The Bouzanquet Bay is a vast freshwater body of the south-eastern part of the Gouin Reservoir, in the territory of the town of La Tuque, in Haute-Mauricie, in the administrative region of Mauricie, in the province of
Quebec, in Canada.

This bay extends into the cantons of Nevers (northern part), Delage (southern part) and Leblanc (eastern part). Following the erection completed in 1948 of the dam Gouin, the current form of "Baie Bouzanquet" was shaped by the raising of the waters of Gouin reservoir.

Recreotourism activities are the main economic activity of the sector. Forestry comes second.

Some secondary forest roads are in use nearby for forestry and recreational tourism activities.

The surface of Baie Bouzanquet is usually frozen from mid-November to the end of April, however, safe ice circulation is generally from early December to the end of March.

Geography

Toponymy
This toponym evokes the work of life of Gaston Bouzanquet, officer of the Legion of Honor and corresponding member of the Society of Geography of Quebec. Bouzanquet published in the Bulletin of the latter (volume 22, numbers 1 and 2, 1928), a text dedicated to the history of New France and to Monsieur de Montcalm in particular. Bouzanquet served as delegate of the committee of Vauvert at the inauguration of the monument of Montcalm, in 1911, in Quebec City.

The toponym "Baie Bouzanquet" was formalized on December 5, 1968, by the Commission de toponymie du Quebec, i.e. at its creation.

Notes and references

See also 

Bays of Quebec
La Tuque, Quebec